Arthur L. Weber is an American chemist, whose research field is pre-life chemistry, was a pioneer to reveal the role of thioester in abiogenesis. He has worked in Salk Institute for Biological Studies and NASA Ames Research Center successively.

References

American chemists
Year of birth missing (living people)
Living people
Salk Institute for Biological Studies people